Vengaboys is a Dutch Eurodance music group based in Rotterdam. The group was the creation of Dutch producers Wessel van Diepen and Dennis van den Driesschen (known as Danski and Delmundo). It consists of lead vocalist Kim Sasabone, female vocalist Denise Post-Van Rijswijk and male vocalists Robin Pors and Donny Latupeirissa. Casting and selection of the act was done by van Diepen.

The group enjoyed commercial success in the late 1990s. They are best known for their hit singles "We Like to Party", "Boom, Boom, Boom, Boom!!", and "We're Going to Ibiza", the latter two of which topped the UK Singles Chart. They have sold an estimated 25 million records worldwide. On 2 May 2001, the World Music Awards gave Vengaboys the award for best-selling dance group of the year. In 2019, Dutch online newspaper Nu.nl called Vengaboys the most successful Dutch pop group in history.

History

1997–1998: Formation and Up and Down
Dutch producers Danski and Delmundo initially found success organising illegal beach parties during the summer.

1998–1999: Second line-up and The Party Album
In 1998, with the addition of the three new members Denise Post-Van Rijswijk, Roy den Burger and Robin Pors and existing member Sasabone, the now four-piece entered the UK Singles Chart at number 4 with "Up and Down", and their follow-up "We Like to Party! (The Vengabus)" peaked at number 1 in Belgium and was a Top 10 hit in other European countries, Canada, Australia, and New Zealand. It reached number 26 on the Billboard Hot 100. Vengaboys released their second album, The Party Album. In June 1999, "Boom Boom Boom Boom" topped the charts in the UK, New Zealand and the Netherlands. In November of that year, "Boom, Boom, Boom, Boom!!" was also used in an advert in Japan for Nissan for their Wingroad 5-door estate. The Party Album! reached the top of the charts in over 20 countries including the U.K., Canada, Germany, Spain, South Africa, Thailand, Poland, Australia, and Mexico. "We're Going to Ibiza", a reworking of Typically Tropical's 1975 number 1 hit "Barbados", also reached the top slot in the Netherlands in September 1999. The LP spent 30 consecutive weeks on the U.S. Billboard 200, and was certified gold (500,000 units) in November 1999. The Party Album! was re-released as Greatest Hits - Part 1. The Remix Album, released in late 1999.

2000–2002: Departure of Pors, The Platinum Album and Hiatus
The single "Cheekah Bow Bow (That Computer Song)" was not as successful as their previous singles. They released their single "Forever as One" in February 2001 with little promotion. The single charted at 28 in the UK, making it their worst-performing single. Shortly after this release, Denise Post-Van Rijswijk and Bakker left the group. The group eventually disbanded for several years. During her departure, Denise Post-van Rijswijk gave birth to her first child.

2006–2009: Return on stage and line-up changes
In 2006, they returned to the club scene with new member Donny Latupeirissa a.k.a. Ma'Donny, replacing den Burger as Cowboy.

2010–2011: The Best of Vengaboys
In 2010, the band released a new single, "Rocket To Uranus", a collaboration with singer-songwriter Pete Burns and American celebrity Perez Hilton, which was only released in their home country in June. The video premiered on 6 June at the Dutch television station TMF, and in 2D and 3D formats on their own website and YouTube channel. They released a Best of in Australia in December 2011.

2012–2013: Single releases

In 2012, Vengaboys began performing a cover of T-Spoon's song "Sex On The Beach" in their live shows. In January 2013, the group first performed "Hot, Hot, Hot", a cover of the 1983 hit originally by 'Arrow' during their National Tour in Australia. The song was released in July 2013 as a single, containing 13 remixes. The single was released worldwide except France on iTunes. Around that time, Kim Sasabone became pregnant. The group continued to maintain a busy tour schedule, with most shows based in Europe and Australia.

2014–2015: X-mas Party Album

In January 2014, Robin Pors said in an interview in Dubai that the group intended to continue touring in Europe and that they were working on future shows in the Middle East and India, along with performing their greatest hits, their latest single, "Hot, Hot, Hot", and reportedly new unreleased tracks. He also stated that releasing new material was planned for 2014. In May 2014 a new remix from their single "To Brazil" re-titled "2 Brazil" was released. In November 2014 a new album was released called The X-mas Party Album including all the Vengaboys hits with a Christmas sound. Also, the single "Where Did My X-mas Tree Go" was released together with a new music video. A tour of South Africa was scheduled for December.

2015-2017: Australia and New Zealand tour
In late February 2015, Denise Post-Van Rijswijk said that she was pregnant with her second child, a girl.

In 2016, the group toured Australia and New Zealand. In June, the Vengaboys hosted MTV Pride, a pop-up channel in the UK, dedicated to the LGBT community.

In November and December 2017, Vengaboys supported Steps at their Party on the Dancefloor Tour.

2019: 20th anniversary and Unplugged EP 
In 2019, Vengaboys celebrated their 20th anniversary and released the songs "Boom, boom, Boom, Boom!! - Unplugged" and "We're going to Ibiza! - Unplugged" in June on an EP titled Unplugged #1's.

2020–2021: Covers and re-mixes 
In the summer of 2020, the band released a festival version of their worldwide hit "Up & Down" with Australian DJ and producer Timmy Trumpet, with the new version credited to Timmy Trumpet x Vengaboys.

In September 2021, the band released a cover version of "1999", Charli XCX's Top 20 UK hit with Troye Sivan, which was retitled "1999 (I Wanna Go Back)" and came with a deep fake-style video which saw the cover stars from various 1990s albums lip-syncing to the song and the band put into the Friends title sequence with the sofa and fountain.

September 20, 2021, also marked the Vengaboys' first live performance since the beginning of the COVID-19 pandemic, taking part in 90's Nostalgia: Electric Circus, a Canadian tour featuring Eurodance music.

Members

Discography

 Up & Down - The Party Album / The Party Album (1998)
 The Platinum Album (2000)

Awards

See also 
 List of number-one dance hits (United States)
 List of artists who reached number one on the US Dance chart

References

External links

 

Musical groups established in 1997
1997 establishments in the Netherlands
Dutch dance music groups
Dutch Eurodance groups
Musical groups from Rotterdam
World Music Awards winners
English-language singers from the Netherlands